Ancyloceras is an extinct genus of heteromorph ammonites found throughout the world during the Lower Cretaceous, from the Lower Barremian epoch until the genus extinction during the Lower Aptian.

Selected species
Ancyloceras audouli Astier, 1851
Ancyloceras fallauxi Uhlig, 1883
Ancyloceras mantelli Casey, 1960
Ancyloceras matheronianum d'Orbigny, 1842
Ancyloceras vandenheckii Astier, 1851

Description
They are known as heteromorph shaped, with a partly uncoiled shell and the aperture directed toward the coiled part.

Most ammonites are homomorph, as they maintain the same shape throughout the growth, while the ammonites in this genus have uncoiled shells (heteromorph or different-shaped ammonites), that would have precluded fast swimming.

Distribution
Fossils of Ancyloceras species are found in the Cretaceous Barremian Stage (117-113 million year old) marine strata of Europe, Colombia and Morocco.

References

External links 
 David L. Clark Anisoceras and Ancyloceras from the Texas Cretaceous Journal of Paleontology - Vol. 32, No. 6 (Nov., 1958), pp. 1076-1081

Ancyloceratoidea
Ammonitida genera
Early Cretaceous ammonites of Europe
Cretaceous animals of Africa
Paja Formation